The 1978 Cal State Hayward Pioneers football team represented California State University, Hayward—now known as California State University, East Bay—as a member of the Far Western Conference (FWC) during the 1978 NCAA Division II football season. Led by fourth-year head coach Tim Tierney, Cal State Hayward compiled an overall record of 8–2 with a mark of 4–1 in conference play, placing second in the FWC. The team outscored its opponents 212 to 136 for the season. The Pioneers played home games at Pioneer Stadium in Hayward, California.

Schedule

References

Cal State Hayward
Cal State Hayward Pioneers football seasons
Cal State Hayward Pioneers football